Sport Club Atlético Mollendo (sometimes referred as Atlético Mollendo) is a Peruvian football club, playing in the city of Mollendo, Arequipa, Peru.

History
The Club Atlético Mollendo was founded on October 10, 1945.

In 2005 Copa Perú, the club classified to the National Stage, but was eliminated by Deportivo Educación in the Round of 16.

In 2012 Copa Perú, the club classified to the Departamental Stage, but was eliminated when finished in 3rd place.

In 2014 Copa Perú, the club classified to the Departamental Stage, but was eliminated in the Group Stage.

In 2015 Copa Perú, the club classified to the Departamental Stage, but was eliminated in the Group Stage.

In 2016 Copa Perú, the club classified to the Departamental Stage, but was eliminated by Binacional in the Second Stage.

Honours

Regional
Región VII:
Runner-up (1): 2005

Liga Departamental de Arequipa:
Runner-up (1): 2005

Liga Provincial de Islay:
Winners (4): 2012, 2014, 2015, 2016
Runner-up (1): 2007

Liga Distrital de Mollendo:
Winners (6): 1974, 1976, 1992, 2005, 2012, 2015
Runner-up (1): 2014

See also
List of football clubs in Peru
Peruvian football league system

References

External links
 

Football clubs in Peru
Association football clubs established in 1945
1945 establishments in Peru